Louis Nganioni (born 3 June 1995) is a French professional footballer who plays as a defender.

Career

Lyon
Nganioni began his career with various local youth clubs before joining Lyon as a youth player in July 2010 and made his professional football debut with Lyon B in 2013. In three years with the reserve side he appeared in 52 matches scoring one goal.

Following his return to Lyon at the beginning of the 2017–2018, Nganioni did not make an appearance for Lyon's first team. At the end of the season, on 30 May, he went on trial with New York Red Bulls. Following his release by Lyon on 1 July, he trialled with Scottish side Dundee F.C. and Austrian Bundesliga club Austria Wien.

Utrecht (loan)
On 9 July 2015, Nganioni was sent on loan to Eredivisie club FC Utrecht. On 8 August 2015 he made his debut for the club in a 3–2 loss to Feyenoord. In his one season with the Dutch side he made 12 appearances.

Brest (loan)
After returning to Lyon, Nganioni was loaned to Ligue 2 side Brest for the 2016–17 campaign. On 26 September 2016 Nganioni made his debut with Brest, appearing as a starter in a 2–1 victory over Stade de Reims. He scored his first goal for the club on 17 March 2017, opening the scoring in a 3–0 victory over Stade Lavallois.

Levski Sofia
On 31 August 2018, Nganioni signed a two-year deal with Bulgarian club Levski Sofia.

Fremad Amager
On 5 September 2019 Danish 1st Division club Fremad Amager announced, that Nganioni had joined the club. The deal was terminated by mutual agreement on 22 July 2020.

Personal life
Nganioni is of Congolese descent.

References

External links
 Profile at LevskiSofia.info
 
 
 
 
 

Living people
1995 births
French footballers
France youth international footballers
French expatriate footballers
Olympique Lyonnais players
FC Utrecht players
Stade Brestois 29 players
PFC Levski Sofia players
Fremad Amager players
FC Tsarsko Selo Sofia players
Eredivisie players
Ligue 2 players
First Professional Football League (Bulgaria) players
Danish 1st Division players
Expatriate footballers in the Netherlands
Expatriate footballers in Bulgaria
Expatriate men's footballers in Denmark
French expatriate sportspeople in the Netherlands
French expatriate sportspeople in Bulgaria
French expatriate sportspeople in Denmark
Association football defenders
French sportspeople of Democratic Republic of the Congo descent
Sportspeople from Melun
Footballers from Seine-et-Marne
Black French sportspeople
20th-century French people
21st-century French people